Police Line  is an Indian Marathi language film directed by Raju Parsekar and produced by Rupali Dipak Pawar and Vaishali Nitin Pawar. The film stars Santosh Juvekar, Sayali Sanjiv, Jayant Savarkar, Satish Pulekar, Pradeep Patwardhan and Nisha Parulekar. Music by Pravin Kunwar and Abhishek Shinde. The film was released on 5 February 2016.

Synopsis 
Police officer Karad is posted to a new area, where he is visited by a gang of goons who bully him. When his senior appears there, the thugs run away and Karad is reprimanded by him.

Cast 
 Santosh Juvekar as Bala
 Sayali Sanjiv as Divya Deshmukh 
 Jayant Savarkar
 Satish Pulekar
 Pradeep Patwardhan
 Nisha Parulekar
 Pramod Pawar
 Vijay Kadam
 Jaywant Wadkar
 Manasi Naik

Soundtrack

Critical response 
Police Line film received mixed reviews from critics. Ganesh Matkari of Pune Mirror wrote "Police Line would have worked far better if it had been conceived more as film and less as a petition for the betterment of the police force". Soumitra Pote of Maharashtra Times wrote "Overall, the intention of presenting the life of the police has been achieved in this movie. But if these shortcomings were removed, this movie would have been more successful". A Reviewer of Lokmat wrote "This is a positive film about the police; But if its setting was more powerful, this film would have been more memorable".

References

External links
 
 

2016 films
2010s Marathi-language films
Indian drama films